Ukraine's 1st electoral district is a Verkhovna Rada constituency in the Autonomous Republic of Crimea. Established in its current form in 2012, it is located entirely in the city of Simferopol. It includes the city's Central and Railway districts. The constituency is home to 162,822 registered voters, and has 94 polling stations. Since the Annexation of Crimea by the Russian Federation in 2014, the seat has been vacant.

Members of Parliament

Elections

2012

See also
Electoral districts of Ukraine
Foreign electoral district of Ukraine

References

Electoral districts of Ukraine
Constituencies established in 2012